David G. Williamson is a British historian, writer, and lecturer. He is the former head of history and politics at Highgate School. Williamson specialises in the history of Germany in the nineteenth century and the first half of the twentieth century, and the military history of the Second World War. He has written two volumes in the popular Seminar Studies in History series and two in the Campaign Chronicles series.

Selected publications
Bismarck and Germany, 1862-90, Longman, 1986. (Seminar Studies in History) 
The British in Germany 1918-1930 - The Reluctant Occupiers, (Berg, Oxford), 1991, 
A Most Diplomatic General: Life of Lord Robertson of Oakridge, Brassey's, 1996. (Brassey's Biographies) 
The Third Reich. Longman, 2002, (Seminar Studies in History) 
Germany Since 1815: A Nation Forged and Renewed, Palgrave Macmillan, 2004. 
The Age of the Dictators: A Study of the European Dictatorships, 1918-53, Routledge, 2007. 
The Siege of Malta 1940-1942, Pen & Sword, 2007, 
Poland Betrayed: The Nazi-Soviet Invasions of 1939, Pen & Sword, 2009. (Campaign Chronicles) 
The Polish Underground 1939-1947, Pen & Sword, 2012. (Campaign Chronicles)

References 

Schoolteachers from London
British historians
Living people
Year of birth missing (living people)